Mahiro (written: 真宏, 真宙, 真尋 or 真広) is a masculine Japanese given name. Notable people with the name include:

, Japanese anime director
, Japanese actor

Fictional characters
, protagonist of the manga series Zetsuen no Tempest
, protagonist of the light novel series Haiyore! Nyaruko-san

Japanese masculine given names